A monster is a type of fictional creature found in horror, fantasy, science fiction, folklore, mythology and religion.

Monster, The Monster or Monsters may also refer to:

Amusement rides
 Monster (ride), an amusement ride manufactured by Eyerly Aircraft Company
 The Monster (Walygator Parc), a roller coaster in Maizières-les-Metz, Lorraine, France
 The Monster (Adventureland), a roller coaster in Altoona, Iowa, United States
 Monster (Gröna Lund), an upcoming roller coasterat Gröna Lund in Stockholm, Sweden

Brands and companies
 Monster Beverage, a beverage company
 Monster Energy, an energy drink
 Monster Cable, an electronics accessories company
 Monster.com, an employment website
 Monster Worldwide, an American provider of employment services

Film and television

Film
 The Monster (1903 film), a French horror film
 The Monster (1925 film), an American horror film
 The Monster (1954 film), an Egyptian crime film
 Monster (1980 film), an American horror film
 The Monster (1994 film), an Italian comedy film
 Monsters, Inc., a 2001 Pixar film that involves two monsters who work at a children's scream processing factory
 Monster (2003 film), an American biographical crime drama film about serial killer Aileen Wuornos
 Monsters (2004 film), a short film
 Monster (2008 film), an American thriller film
 Monsters (2010 film), a British sci-fi film
 Monster (2014 film), a Korean film
 Monsters (2015 film), a Chinese horror film
 The Monster (2016 film), an American horror film
 Monster (2018 film), an American drama film based on the Walter Dean Myers novel
 Monster (2019 film), a Tamil-language comedy film
 Monsters., a 2019 Romanian drama film
Arracht, also called Monster, 2019 Irish historical drama film
 Monster (2022 film), a Malayalam-language thriller film
 Monster!, a 1999 TV film by John Lafia
 Monster, a 2005 short film by Jennifer Kent that was the precursor to The Babadook
 Monsters, a 2014 comedy video by Lee Evans

Television
 Monsters HD, an American channel
 Monster (anime), a 2004 Japanese anime television series based upon the manga by Naoki Urasawa
 Monsters (American TV series), a 1988–1991 America horror anthology television series that aired in syndication
 Monsters (Japanese TV series), a 2012 Japanese television series from TBS
 Monster (South Korean TV series), a 2016 South Korean television series
 The Monster (TV series), a 2019 Iranian series by Mehran Modiri
 Beyond Evil (TV series), a 2021 South Korean drama whose original title in Korean translates to Monster
 Monster, a 2022 Netflix anthology series, Dahmer – Monster: The Jeffrey Dahmer Story being the first season

Episodes 
 "Monster" (Aqua Teen Hunger Force)
 "Monster" (The Flash)
 "The Monster" (Highway to Heaven)
 "Monster" (Law & Order: Criminal Intent)
 "Monster" (Millennium)
 "Monsters" (Roswell)
 "Monster" (Star Wars: The Clone Wars)
 "Monster" (The Outer Limits)
 "Monsters" (The Walking Dead)
 "Monster" (Fear the Walking Dead)

Literature
 The Monster (novella), a novella by Stephen Crane
 Monster (Kellerman novel)
 Monster (Myers novel)
 Monster (manga), a manga series by Naoki Urasawa
 Monster (Peretti novel)
 Monster: The Autobiography of an L.A. Gang Member, a memoir by Sanyika Shakur
 The Monster (short story), a short story by A.E. Van Vogt
 Monsters (collection), a collection of short stories by A.E. van Vogt
 Monsters (anthology), an anthology of science fiction short stories
 "Monsters", a manga short story by Eiichiro Oda
 The Monster (Përbindëshi), a novel by Ismail Kadare
 The Monster, a 1968 play by Ron Milner

Games
 Monster (computer gaming), a type of non-player character
 Monsters, a clone of the arcade game Space Panic

Music

Musicians and bands
 Monster (musician)
 Monster (band)
 The Monsters, Swiss Psychobilly band lead by Reverend Beat-Man

Albums
 Monster (B'z album)
 Monsters (D'espairsRay album)
 Monster (Fetchin Bones album)
 Monster (Herbie Hancock album)
 Monster (Hugh Cornwell album)
 Monster (Killer Mike album)
 Monster (Kiss album)
 Monsters (Meat Puppets album)
 Monsters (Tom Odell album)
 Monster (Oomph! album)
 Monster (R.E.M. album)
 Monster (Steppenwolf album)
 Monster (David Thomas album)
 Monster (Usher album)
 Monster (EP), by Red Velvet – Irene & Seulgi
 Monster (mixtape), by Future
 Monster, a 2013 album by Noyz Narcos
 Monster, a cancelled album by P-Model

Songs
 "Monster" (Arashi song)
 "Monster" (The Automatic song)
 "Monster" (Big Bang song)
 "Monster" (Disturbed song)
 "Monster" (Disney song), song from the musical adaption of Frozen
 "Monster" (Exo song)
 "Monster" (Gabbie Hanna song)
 "Monster" (Imagine Dragons song)
 "Monster" (Kanye West song)
 "Monster" (L7 song)
 "Monster" (Lady Gaga song)
 "Monster" (Meek Mill song)
 "Monster" (Meg & Dia song)
 "Monster" (Michael Jackson song)
 "Monster" (Paramore song)
 "Monster" (Pink Lady song)
 "Monster" (Professor Green song)
 "Monster" (Red Velvet – Irene & Seulgi song)
 "Monster" (Shawn Mendes and Justin Bieber song)
 "Monster" (Skillet song)
 "Monster" (Starset song)
 "Monster" (Steppenwolf song)
 "Monster" (Yoasobi song)
 "Monster" (21 Savage song)
 "The Monster" (song), a song by Eminem featuring Rihanna
 "Monsters" (All Time Low song)
 "Monsters" (Eric Church song)
 "Monsters" (Funeral for a Friend song)
 "Monsters" (James Blunt song)
 "Monsters" (Saara Aalto song)
 "Monster", a song by Dodie Clark from Human
 "Monster", a song by Fred Schneider from the album Fred Schneider and the Shake Society
 "Monster", a song by Kris Allen from the 2012 album Thank You Camellia
 "Monster", a song by LUM!X and Gabry Ponte
 "Monsters", a song by Blue Öyster Cult from the album Cultösaurus Erectus
 "Monsters", a song by Matchbook Romance from the album Voices
 "Monsters", a song by Shinedown from Attention Attention
 "Monsters", a song by Something for Kate from the 2001 album Echolalia
 "Monsters", a song by Timeflies ft. Katie Sky

People
 Rob Monster (born 1966 or 1967), American technology executive
 Dick Radatz (1937–2005), American baseball pitcher nicknamed "The Monster"
 Sanyika Shakur (1963–2021), American author and gang member with the street moniker "Monster"
 Nobuhiro Tajima (born 1950), Japanese rally driver nicknamed "Monster"

Science and mathematics
 Monster (physics)
 Monster group, a large but finite algebraic structure in mathematical group theory
 Spiegelman Monster, an RNA chain

Other uses
 Monster, South Holland, a town in the Netherlands
 Ducati Monster, a motorcycle
 Landkreuzer P. 1500 Monster, a self-propelled gun
 IT (XM) or Monster, a radio program

See also
 
 London Monster, an unidentified man who attacked several women in late 18th century London
 Monstrum (disambiguation)
 Moonster (disambiguation)
 Munster (disambiguation)

Lists of people by nickname